"Say hello to my little friend!", a quotation from the 1983 film Scarface
 "Say Hello to My Little Friend" (Awake), eleventh episode of the American television police procedural fantasy drama Awake
 "Say Hello to My Little Friend" (Scandal), the fourth episode of the third season of the American television series Scandal
 "Say Hello to My Little Friend", a song by Blessid Union of Souls from the 2005 album Perception